The Book of Jer3miah is an American live-action web series created by a group of Brigham Young University students and faculty members. It follows the experience of college freshman, Jeremiah Whitney, who accepts the charge to protect a mysterious Mesoamerican box. When Jeremiah's parents are mysteriously murdered, Jeremiah learns that he is the target of a frightening conspiracy, requiring courage and faith to escape. Every facet of his life is called into question, and now he must uncover the truth about the box, the conspiracy, and his very identity, before it's too late. The series follows Jeremiah as he defends his life and the lives of his friends from the mounting threats that surround them. The show's first season, due to funding constraints, was created with almost no budget and consists of 20 two- to fifteen-minute webisodes. The series also incorporates an alternate reality game with its hub at TheDavenportPapers.com.

Production

Influences 
The project is inspired by Web 2.0 fiction like Gemini Division, 24's The Rookie, and webisodes from The Office.  It also follows the interactive nature of Bungee's I Love Bees experience, The Truth About Marika, and BMW's The Hire game.  It is the first known university-sponsored web series that uses transmedia storytelling, and also the first Latter-day Saint themed web series.

Tonally, the show has been compared to serialized programs like Lost, 24 and Twin Peaks. It has also been compared to the fictional works of filmmaker Richard Dutcher and LDS author Orson Scott Card, whose article, "The Problem of Evil in Fiction", was used extensively by the BYU class when developing the series.

Concept 
The series is a pioneering program aimed to produce entertaining and accessible New Media for Latter-day Saint audiences, as well as for general audiences and families. It was designed and intended to be a participation drama. The project uses Vimeo for video hosting, and involves viewers through Twitter, Facebook, and custom Ning networks. It is a class project created by Theater & Media Arts associate professor Jeff Parkin and produced by Jeff Parkin, Jared Cardon, and over 30 students.  Without a textbook, the planning and conceptualization for the series were assisted by concepts derived from readings in Wired magazine, the writings of Henry Jenkins, and the writings of Gideon Burton. The webisodes incorporate themes from The Book of Mormon, and the plot involves Utah and Mormon folklore, especially myths and Native American legends surrounding Manti, UT.

Themes

Distribution 
The first three webisodes premiered in the Varsity Theater on the Brigham Young University campus, as well as online. Subsequent episodes debuted on www.jer3miah.com every Friday, with the season finale airing on 12 June 2009.

A novel, The Book of Jer3miah: Premonition, based on the webseries was published on 4 March 2013.

Alternate-reality game

Premise
In addition to traditional webisodes, the project includes an interactive online experience through TheDavenportPapers.com, ZoobyNews.com, and other sites. Viewers work together to uncover the plot of the series from clues within the show and online puzzles. The game also extends to physical clues around the Brigham Young University campus including statues, plaques, and GPS locations where more clues are hidden.

Reception

Awards 
On 14 April 2010, the 14th Annual Webby Awards, hailed as the "Oscars of the Internet" by The New York Times, announced that The Book of Jer3miah was selected as an Official Honoree in the Drama category for Online Film & Video. The list of honorees also includes productions from Sony Pictures Television, Disney-ABC, BET, and IFC.

Critical reception 
Jill Weinberger of the New York Times called it "a tight, suspenseful little series [that] may just have what it takes to get web audiences to utter the words 'Mormon conspiracy thriller' without a touch of irony." This article reviewed the series from several angles, including overall success, religious implications, characters, writing, acting, and direction. She compares it to other web series, noting that it is "a big leap forward in terms of university-sponsored transmedia content, and yet, the online collaboration between fans is so fervent that you don’t have to be anywhere near the campus to be part of the action."  "There’s quick dialogue, funny supporting characters. It’s [an] engaging piece of new media."

Kent Larsen wrote an article for [Times & Seasons], entitled "Jer3miah, The Great Mormon Novel, and The Problem with Mormon Media". The article states that "Jer3miah breaks some of the taboos" established in Mormon media, i.e., "because we [Mormons] have been persecuted and continue to be criticized, we must shield ourselves and our practice from outsiders to maintain how sacred it is. Our image must be faultless, so that no one will be dissuaded from investigating the Church because of our faults." The articles uses The Book of Jer3miah as an example of breaking this trepidation. Larsen says, "The real solution to our [Mormon] image is, of course, to let people see us and understand us. When we portray our sacred in film and fiction, others will believe that our sacred is, in fact, sacred, although, admittedly, at the risk that others will ridicule." Regarding this discussion, Jeff Parkin is referenced as saying the following in the article:

In Gideon Burton's article, "The Book of Jer3miah: New Media Mormonism", he wrote, "Parkin's creation swims upstream against the well-established modes of Mormon media, but there is a confidence to the production, a palpable enthusiam echoed in the fanbase and the ancillary media filling out the series folklore." "One could say Jer3miah is more intimate with things Mormon than more official Mormon productions. For example, inherent in Mormonism is a deep-seated sense of history and a connectedness to past and future generations. The dramatic translation of those concepts within Jer3miah is cliff-hanging events that turn on genealogical information and on strange visitors invoking the ancient Nephite setting of the Book of Mormon. Like the embattled hosts within the more epic portions of the Mormon bible, Jeremiah finds himself facing secret combinations of evil."

Adam Greenwood wrote an article, entitled "The Book of Jer3miah". Greenwood examines the show from a critical and doctrinal standpoint saying that "The Book of Jeremiah shares the realization that verisimilitude in fiction is a means, not an end. The story takes us full-bore into a world where 3 Nephite folklore and secret conspiracies and all the weird Manti stories and the Holy Ghost telling you to do inexplicable things are all true. I was half-fascinated, and half-horrified that someone who wasn’t a Mormon might be watching this stuff."

Liz Shannon Miller of NewTeeVee published an article, entitled "Rant: Rumors of the Death of Web Series Have Been Greatly Exaggerated". Within the article she lists The Book of Jer3miah as one of "10 quality indie shows, made in the last year." Shannon Miller says that "niche shows have popped up that appeal to specific communities, for example, The Book of Jer3miah was made for Mormons, by Mormons. And that’s one of the brilliant things about the current state of the medium – under-served audiences are finally getting content, and reasonably well-made content, that appeals to them.

Fan response 
On 2 February 2009 The Daily Universe ran an article about The Book of Jer3miah, including interviews with series creators Jeff Parkin and Jared Cardon.

On 6 March 2009 The Daily Universe ran another article about The Book of Jer3miah, this time focusing on the ARG aspect of the show and only interviewing participants of the game.

Episodes

References

External links 
 
 
 The Book of Jer3miah at Vimeo
 Interview with Parkin & Cardon in "Mormon Artist" by Davey Morrison Dillard Mormon Artist – issue 7

2009 web series debuts
2009 web series endings
American drama web series
Tie-in alternate reality games
Brigham Young University
Mormonism in fiction
Conspiracy web series